Acridini is a tribe of insects in the subfamily Acridinae,  of the insect family Acrididae and are sometimes called "silent slant-faced grasshoppers". It was firstly described as Truxalis Conicus in 1781

Description
Insects of this tribe are usually slender and like other members of the subfamily Acridinae lack stridulatory pegs and are silent.

Genera
This tribe includes several monotypic Australian genera; the Orthoptera Species File lists:.
 Acrida Linnaeus, 1758 (widespread in Old World & Australasia)
 Acridarachnea Bolívar, 1908 (Africa) monotypic:
 Acridarachnea ophthalmica Bolívar, 1908
 Caledia Bolívar, 1914 (Australia) monotypic:
 Caledia captiva (Fabricius, 1775)
 Calephorops Sjöstedt, 1920 (Australia) monotypic:
 Calephorops viridis Sjöstedt, 1920
 Cryptobothrus Rehn, 1907 (Australia, synonyms Austrobothrus Sjöstedt, 1921, Exobothrus Sjöstedt, 1936) monotypic:
 Cryptobothrus chrysophorus Rehn, 1907

 Froggattina Tillyard, 1926 (Australia) monotypic:
 Froggattina australis (Walker, 1870)
 Keshava (insect) Gupta & Chandra, 2017 (India)
 Keshava barnawaparensis Gupta & Chandra, 2017
 Keshava jugadensis Gupta & Chandra, 2017
 Keshava shishodensis Gupta & Chandra, 2017
 Perala Sjöstedt, 1921 (Australia) monotypic:
 Perala viridis Sjöstedt, 1921
 Rapsilla Sjöstedt, 1921 (Australia) monotypic:
 Rapsilla fusca Sjöstedt, 1921
 Schizobothrus Sjöstedt, 1921 (Australia)  monotypic:
 Schizobothrus flavovittatus Sjöstedt, 1921

References

External links

Acrididae
Orthoptera tribes
Taxa named by Pierre André Latreille